Steve Holcombe (born 16 May 1994) is a British professional Enduro racer. Seven time World FIM EnduroGP Champion, 3 time Enduro GP overall champ 2017, 2019 & 2020 and three time Enduro 3 (E3) champion 2016, 2018 & 2019 and 2020 Enduro (E2) champ. He rides for Factory Beta. He and fellow Brit Brad Freeman are currently dominating the Enduro World Championship having swept the 2020 EnduroGP, Enduro2 and Enduro3 world titles.

References 

1994 births
Living people
English motorcycle racers